Alex Vincent Crisano (born February 26, 1976) is a Filipino-American former professional basketball player.

First Years
Crisano was undrafted in 2000 but he was signed and directly hired by the Barangay Ginebra Kings. However, his stay with the Gin Kings was cut at the end of the 2004 PBA Fiesta Conference. He also played for the Talk 'N Text Tropang Texters that were known as the Phone Pals.

Return to Barangay Ginebra
Before the start of the 2008 PBA Fiesta Conference, the management of Ginebra announced that Crisano will return for the team. From there, his game as an energy player and a crowd favorite was seen by the fans. He helped the team beat the Air21 Express in the finals 4–3.

Barako Bull
After two conferences with Ginebra, he was acquired by the Barako Bull Energy Boosters during the 2009 PBA Fiesta Conference where he became the leader of the team. At the 2009–10 Philippine Cup, he had a career season averaging 8.9 points 6.2 rebounds and 32 percent from the 3-point line. However, the team did not make the playoffs finishing at the bottom of the standings with a 3–15 record. Also, due to financial problems of the franchise, he was not able to stay with the team for the following conference.

Philippine Patriots
He was chosen as one of the players for the Philippine Patriots in the Asean Basketball League alongside Allan Salangsang and Egay Billones to defend their title. However, they lost to the Chang Thailand Slammers in the finals.

Powerade Tigers
After his stint with the Patriots, he was acquired by the Powerade Tigers to boost up their frontline.

Globalport Batang Pier
He was played in 1 Regular Season of Globalport Batang Pier in 2012–2013

Blackwater Elite
He return played in Pba as 1 Regular Season of Blackwater Elite in 2014–2015.

References

1976 births
Living people
Barako Bull Energy Boosters players
Barangay Ginebra San Miguel players
Brooklyn Bulldogs men's basketball players
Centers (basketball)
Filipino men's basketball players
NorthPort Batang Pier players
Powerade Tigers players
Power forwards (basketball)
TNT Tropang Giga players
Doping cases in basketball
American men's basketball players
Brooklyn College alumni
American sportspeople of Filipino descent
Citizens of the Philippines through descent